Tom Bennett is a British actor. He has appeared in many British television shows, including The Hunt for Tony Blair, Red Cap, The Worst Week of My Life, My Hero, Life Begins, The Booze Cruise II, Foyle's War, Midsomer Murders and EastEnders, playing Steve Clarke.

He is a son of actor Colin Bennett.

His early television appearances include Shoot The Writers! (2004), with Gavin Kensit, a late night comedy sketch show that doubled as a competition for new writers. He starred in the E4 television series PhoneShop, playing the character 'Christopher'.

In 2013, he appeared in Family Tree (an HBO series) as best mate to Chris O'Dowd's character.

In 2016, he drew critical praise for his role as Sir James Martin, a foolish nobleman in the Jane Austen movie adaptation Love & Friendship.

In February 2019, he starred as Del Boy in Only Fools and Horses The Musical at the Theatre Royal Haymarket, which ran until March 2020 before taking a hiatus due to the COVID-19 pandemic. The show reopened on 1 October 2021 with Bennett reprising his role.

Filmography

References

External links

Living people
British male soap opera actors
Year of birth missing (living people)